Frank Eaton (12 November 1902–1979) was an English footballer who played in the Football League for Barnsley, Queens Park Rangers and Reading.

References

1902 births
1979 deaths
English footballers
Association football forwards
English Football League players
Oldham Athletic A.F.C. players
New Mills A.F.C. players
Barnsley F.C. players
Reading F.C. players
Queens Park Rangers F.C. players